Ethan Pringle (born May 30, 1986, in San Francisco, California) is an American rock climber with notable ascents in bouldering, sport climbing and traditional climbing.

Notable ascents

Sport climbing
 5.15b (9b)
 Jumbo Love: , May 18, 2015. First Repeat. First Ascent by Chris Sharma September 11, 2008.
 5.15a (9a+)
 Biographie: . Fourth Repeat. First Ascent by Chris Sharma July 2001.
 Thor's Hammer: 5.15a (9a+). Fifth Ascent. Repeated just one day after Daniel Woods got the fourth ascent
 5.14d (9a)
 Everything is Karate: 5.14c/d (8c+/9a), April 22, 2017. First Ascent.
 Spicy Dumpling: 5.14d (9a), December 20, 2010. First Ascent.
 La Reina Mora: 5.14d (8c+/9a), March 13, 2016. First Ascent by Ramon Julian 2008.

Traditional climbing
5.14c (8c+)
 Blackbeard's Tears: 5.14c (8c+), September 21, 2016. First Free Ascent.

Onsighted
 Iron Man: .
 Moonlight Buttress: .

Bouldering
V15 (8C)
 The Wheel of Life 
 The Nest  
 Kintsugi 
V14 (8B+)
 Red Rocks  First Ascent 
 Slashface  First Ascent by Fred Nicole
 Meadowlark Lemon V14 (8B+)  First Ascent by Paul Robinson

See also 
History of rock climbing
List of first ascents (sport climbing)

References

Living people
Sportspeople from San Francisco
1986 births
American rock climbers